Rascal is a single-board computer.  It is designed by Brandon Stafford and sold by Rascal Micro LLC in Somerville, Massachusetts.

Features
The Rascal runs Linux.  Its board design is compatible with Arduino shields.  It includes web server software and is intended to be programmed in Python.

The Rascal's web server includes an editor that lets users edit the Python programs running on the Rascal from any web browser, without needing to reflash anything.

Most Arduino shields are compatible with the standard headers on the Rascal.

The Rascal's design files have been released as Open Hardware
under the Creative Commons CC BY-SA license.
Those design files have been posted to github.

References

External links
 

Open hardware electronic devices
Robotics hardware
Arduino
Single-board computers